The New Progressive Party of Puerto Rico was founded in 1967. Since then, the party has been led by 12 different presidents in 16 terms of leadership. Every president of the political party has held a position in the Puerto Rican government. The first party president was Luis A. Ferré, who served from 1967 to 1974. The presidents who served twice are: Carlos Romero Barceló, who served from 1974 to 1987 and again from 1989 to 1991, Pedro Rosselló, who served from 1991 to 1999 and again from 2003 to 2008 and Carlos Pesquera who served from 1999 to 2000 and again from 2001 to 2003, and the current president of the New Progressive Party is Pedro Pierluisi and Governor of Puerto Rico, who served from January 2013 to June 2016, and from August 2020 to present.

List of presidents 
{| class="wikitable sortable" style="margin: 0 auto"
!#
!Portrait
!Name
!Term start
!Term end
!Previous public posts
|-
|1
|
|Luis A. Ferré
|20 August 1967
|7 October 1974
|President of the Puerto Rico SenateGovernor
|-
|2
|
|Carlos Romero Barceló
|7 October 1974
|20 June 1987
|Mayor of San JuanGovernorResident Commissioner
|-
|3
|
|Baltasar Corrada del Río
|20 June 1987
|11 January 1988
|Resident Commissioner of Puerto RicoMayor of San JuanSecretary of StateAssociate Justice of the Puerto Rico Supreme Court
|-
|4
|
|Ramón Luis Rivera
|11 January 1988
|2 January 1989
|Puerto Rico House of RepresentativesMayor of Bayamón
|-
|5
|
|Carlos Romero Barceló
|2 January 1989
|23 March 1991
|Mayor of San JuanGovernorResident Commissioner
|-
|6
|
|Pedro Rosselló
|23 March 1991
|10 September 1999
|GovernorPuerto Rico Senate
|-
|7
|
|Carlos Pesquera
|10 September 1999
|17 February 2000
|Secretary of Transportation
|-
|8
|
|Norma Burgos
|17 February 2000
|2 January 2001
|Secretary of StatePuerto Rico Senate
|-
|9
|
|Leonides Díaz Urbina
|2 January 2001
|5 April 2001
|Puerto Rico House of Representatives
|-
|10
|
|Carlos Pesquera
|5 April 2001
|14 October 2003
|Secretary of Transportation
|-
|11
|
|Pedro Rosselló
|14 October 2003
|21 December 2008
|GovernorPuerto Rico Senate
|-
|12
|
|Luis Fortuño
|21 December 2008
|2 January 2013
|Resident CommissionerGovernor
|-
|13
|
|Pedro Pierluisi
|2 January 2013
|23 June 2016
|Secretary of JusticeResident Commissioner
|-
|14
|
|Ricardo Rosselló
|23 June 2016
|22 July 2019
|Governor of Puerto Rico
|-
|15
|
|Thomas Rivera Schatz
|22 July 2019
|25 August 2020
|President Of The Puerto Rican Senate
|-
|16
|
|Pedro Pierluisi
|25 August 2020
|Present
|Secretary of JusticeResident CommissionerGovernor

New Progressive Party (Puerto Rico)